Lucy Fox (October 25, 1897 – May 21, 1970) was an American actress active in the era of silent film.

Partial filmography

 Just for Tonight (1918)
 Why I Would Not Marry? (1918)
 The Bishop's Emeralds (1919)
 The Winchester Woman (1919)
 Something Different (1920)
 The Flaming Clue (1920)
 The Empire of Diamonds (1920)
 Hurricane Hutch (1921)
 The Money Maniac (1921)
 My Old Kentucky Home (1922)
 Sonny (1922)
 What Fools Men Are (1922)
 Speed (1922)
 Toilers of the Sea (1923)
 The Lone Wolf (1924)
 Miami (1924)
 Teeth (1924)
 The Trail Rider (1925)
 The Necessary Evil (1925)
 The Arizona Romeo (1925)
 Bluebeard's Seven Wives (1926)

References

Bibliography
 Solomon, Aubrey. The Fox Film Corporation, 1915-1935: A History and Filmography. McFarland, 2011.

External links

1897 births
1970 deaths
American film actresses
People from New York City
20th-century American actresses